Sputinow is an unincorporated community in central Alberta within the Municipal District of Bonnyville No. 87, located  north of Highway 45,  south of Cold Lake.

Communities on Métis settlements in Alberta
Localities in the Municipal District of Bonnyville No. 87